Danish is a North Germanic language spoken by about six million people, principally in and around Denmark. Communities of Danish speakers are also found in Greenland, the Faroe Islands, and the northern German region of Southern Schleswig, where it has minority language status. Minor Danish-speaking communities are also found in Norway, Sweden, the United States, Canada, Brazil, and Argentina.

Along with the other North Germanic languages, Danish is a descendant of Old Norse, the common language of the Germanic peoples who lived in Scandinavia during the Viking Era. Danish, together with Swedish, derives from the East Norse dialect group, while the Middle Norwegian language (before the influence of Danish) and Norwegian Bokmål are classified as West Norse along with Faroese and Icelandic. A more recent classification based on mutual intelligibility separates modern spoken Danish, Norwegian, and Swedish as "mainland (or continental) Scandinavian", while Icelandic and Faroese are classified as "insular Scandinavian". Although the written languages are compatible, spoken Danish is distinctly different from Norwegian and Swedish and thus the degree of mutual intelligibility with either is variable between regions and speakers.

Until the 16th century, Danish was a continuum of dialects spoken from Southern Jutland and Schleswig to Scania with no standard variety or spelling conventions. With the Protestant Reformation and the introduction of the printing press, a standard language was developed which was based on the educated dialect of Copenhagen and Malmö. It spread through use in the education system and administration, though German and Latin continued to be the most important written languages well into the 17th century. Following the loss of territory to Germany and Sweden, a nationalist movement adopted the language as a token of Danish identity, and the language experienced a strong surge in use and popularity, with major works of literature produced in the 18th and 19th centuries. Today, traditional Danish dialects have all but disappeared, though regional variants of the standard language exist. The main differences in language are between generations, with youth language being particularly innovative.

Danish has a very large vowel inventory consisting of 27 phonemically distinctive vowels, and its prosody is characterized by the distinctive phenomenon , a kind of laryngeal phonation type. Due to the many pronunciation differences that set Danish apart from its neighboring languages, particularly the vowels, difficult prosody and "weakly" pronounced consonants, it is sometimes considered to be a "difficult language to learn, acquire and understand", and some evidence shows that children are slower to acquire the phonological distinctions of Danish compared to other languages. The grammar is moderately inflective with strong (irregular) and weak (regular) conjugations and inflections. Nouns and demonstrative pronouns distinguish common and neutral gender. Like English, Danish only has remnants of a former case system, particularly in the pronouns. Unlike English, it has lost all person marking on verbs. Its word order is V2, with the finite verb always occupying the second slot in the sentence.

Classification 

Danish is a Germanic language of the North Germanic branch. Other names for this group are the Nordic or Scandinavian languages. Along with Swedish, Danish descends from the Eastern dialects of the Old Norse language; Danish and Swedish are also classified as East Scandinavian or East Nordic languages.

Scandinavian languages are often considered a dialect continuum, where no sharp dividing lines are seen between the different vernacular languages.

Like Norwegian and Swedish, Danish was significantly influenced by Low German in the Middle Ages, and has been influenced by English since the turn of the 20th century.

Danish itself can be divided into three main dialect areas: Jutlandic (West Danish), Insular Danish (including the standard variety), and East Danish (including Bornholmian and Scanian). Under the view that Scandinavian is a dialect continuum, East Danish can be considered intermediary between Danish and Swedish, while Scanian can be considered a Swedified East Danish dialect, and Bornholmian is its closest relative. 

Contemporary Scanian is fully mutually intelligible with Swedish and less so with Danish since it shares a standardized vocabulary and less distinct pronunciations with the rest of Sweden than in the past. Blekinge and Halland, the two other provinces further away from Copenhagen that transitioned to Sweden in the 17th century, speak dialects more similar to standard Swedish.

Vocabulary 

About 2000 of Danish non-compound words are derived from the Old Norse language, and ultimately from Proto Indo-European. Of these 2000 words, 1200 are nouns, 500 are verbs, 180 are adjectives and the rest belong to other word classes. Danish has also absorbed a large number of loan words, most of which were borrowed from Middle Low German in the late medieval period. Out of the 500 most frequently used words in Danish, 100 are medieval loans from Middle Low German, as Low German was the other official language of Denmark–Norway. In the 17th and 18th centuries, standard German and French superseded Low German influence and in the 20th century, English became the main supplier of loan words, especially after World War II. As well as loan words, new words are freely formed by compounding existing words. In standard texts of contemporary Danish, Middle Low German loans account for about 16–17% of the vocabulary, Graeco-Latin-loans 4–8%, French 2–4% and English about 1%.

Danish and English are both Germanic languages. Danish is a North Germanic language descended from Old Norse, and English is a West Germanic language descended from Old English. Old Norse exerted a strong influence on Old English in the early medieval period. To see their shared Germanic heritage, one merely has to note the many common words that are very similar in the two languages. 'child'). In addition, the word , meaning "village" or "town", occurs in many English place-names, such as Whitby and Selby, as remnants of the Viking occupation. During the latter period, English adopted "are", the third person plural form of the verb "to be", as well as the corresponding personal pronoun form "they" from contemporary Old Norse.

Mutual intelligibility 
Danish is largely mutually intelligible with Norwegian and Swedish. Proficient speakers of any of the three languages can often understand the others fairly well, though studies have shown that the mutual intelligibility is asymmetric: speakers of Norwegian generally understand both Danish and Swedish far better than Swedes or Danes understand each other. Both Swedes and Danes also understand Norwegian better than they understand each other's languages. The reason Norwegian occupies a middle position in terms of intelligibility is because of its shared border with Sweden resulting in a similarity in pronunciation, combined with the long tradition of having Danish as a written language which has led to similarities in vocabulary. Among younger Danes, Copenhageners are worse at understanding Swedish than Danes from the provinces. In general, younger Danes are not as good at understanding the neighboring languages as Norwegian and Swedish youths.

History 

The Danish philologist Johannes Brøndum-Nielsen divided the history of Danish into a period from 800 AD to 1525 to be "Old Danish", which he subdivided into "Runic Danish" (800-1100), Early Middle Danish (1100–1350) and Late Middle Danish (1350–1525).

Runic Danish 

By the eighth century, the common Germanic language of Scandinavia, Proto-Norse, had undergone some changes and evolved into Old Norse.
This language was generally called the "Danish tongue", or "Norse language". Norse was written in the runic alphabet, first with the elder futhark and from the 9th century with the younger futhark.

From the seventh century, the common Norse language began to undergo changes that did not spread to all of Scandinavia, resulting in the appearance of two dialect areas, Old West Norse (Norway and Iceland) and Old East Norse (Denmark and Sweden). Most of the changes separating East Norse from West Norse started as innovations in Denmark, that spread through Scania into Sweden and by maritime contact to southern Norway. This is reflected in runic inscriptions where the older read  and the later . Also, a change of au as in  into ø as in  occurred. This change is shown in runic inscriptions as a change from  into . This monophthongization started in Jutland and spread eastward, having spread throughout Denmark and most of Sweden by 1100.

Through Danish conquest, Old East Norse was once widely spoken in the northeast counties of England. Many words derived from Norse, such as "gate" for street, still survive in Yorkshire, the East Midlands and East Anglia, and parts of eastern England colonized by Danish Vikings. The city of York was once the Viking settlement of Jorvik. Several other English words derive from Old East Norse, for example "knife", "husband", and "egg". The suffix "-by" for 'town' is common in place names in Yorkshire and the east Midlands, for example Selby, Whitby, Derby, and Grimsby. The word "dale" meaning valley is common in Yorkshire and Derbyshire placenames.

Old and Middle dialects 

In the medieval period, Danish emerged as a separate language from Swedish. The main written language was Latin, and the few Danish-language texts preserved from this period are written in the Latin alphabet, although the runic alphabet seems to have lingered in popular usage in some areas. The main text types written in this period are laws, which were formulated in the vernacular language to be accessible also to those who were not Latinate. The Jutlandic Law and Scanian Law were written in vernacular Danish in the early 13th century. Beginning in 1350, Danish began to be used as a language of administration, and new types of literature began to be written in the language, such as royal letters and testaments. The orthography in this period was not standardized nor was the spoken language, and the regional laws demonstrate the dialectal differences between the regions in which they were written.

Throughout this period, Danish was in contact with Low German, and many Low German loan words were introduced in this period. With the Protestant Reformation in 1536, Danish also became the language of religion, which sparked a new interest in using Danish as a literary language.

The first complete translation of the Bible in Danish, the Bible of Christian II translated by Christiern Pedersen, was published in 1550. Pedersen's orthographic choices set the de facto standard for subsequent writing in Danish. From around 1500, several printing presses were in operation in Denmark publishing in Danish and other languages. In the period after 1550, presses in Copenhagen dominated the publication of material in the Danish language.

Early Modern 

Following the first Bible translation, the development of Danish as a written language, as a language of religion, administration, and public discourse accelerated. In the second half of the 17th century, grammarians elaborated grammars of Danish, first among them Rasmus Bartholin's 1657 Latin grammar ; then Laurids Olufsen Kock's 1660 grammar of the Zealand dialect ; and in 1685 the first Danish grammar written in Danish,  ("The Art of the Danish Language") by Peder Syv. Major authors from this period are Thomas Kingo, poet and psalmist, and Leonora Christina Ulfeldt, whose novel  (Remembered Woes) is considered a literary masterpiece by scholars. Orthography was still not standardized and the principles for doing so were vigorously discussed among Danish philologists. In this period, scholars were also discussing whether it was best to "write as one speaks" or to "speak as one writes", including whether archaic grammatical forms that had fallen out of use in the vernacular, such as the plural form of verbs, should be conserved in writing (i.e. "he is" vs.  "they are").

The East Danish provinces were lost to Sweden after the Second Treaty of Brömsebro (1645) after which they were gradually Swedified; just as Norway was politically severed from Denmark, beginning also a gradual end of Danish influence on Norwegian (influence through the shared written standard language remained). With the introduction of absolutism in 1660, the Danish state was further integrated, and the language of the Danish chancellery, a Zealandic variety with German and French influence, became the de facto official standard language, especially in writing—this was the original so-called  ("Danish of the Realm"). It affected all of the areas where Danish had been influential, including all of Denmark, Southern Sweden, and coastal southern Norway.

In the 18th century, Danish philology was advanced by Rasmus Rask, who pioneered the disciplines of comparative and historical linguistics, and wrote the first English-language grammar of Danish. Literary Danish continued to develop with the works of Ludvig Holberg, whose plays and historical and scientific works laid the foundation for the Danish literary canon. With the Danish colonization of Greenland by Hans Egede, Danish became the administrative and religious language there, while Iceland and the Faroe Islands had the status of Danish colonies with Danish as an official language until the mid-20th century.

Standardized national language 

Following the loss of Schleswig to Germany, a sharp influx of German speakers moved into the area, eventually outnumbering the Danish speakers. The political loss of territory sparked a period of intense nationalism in Denmark, coinciding with the so-called "Golden Age" of Danish culture. Authors such as N.F.S. Grundtvig emphasized the role of language in creating national belonging. Some of the most cherished Danish-language authors of this period are existential philosopher Søren Kierkegaard and prolific fairy tale author Hans Christian Andersen. The influence of popular literary role models, together with increased requirements of education did much to strengthen the Danish language, and also started a period of homogenization, whereby the Copenhagen standard language gradually displaced the regional vernacular languages. Throughout the 19th century, Danes emigrated, establishing small expatriate communities in the Americas, particularly in the US, Canada, and Argentina, where memory and some use of Danish remains today.

After the Schleswig referendum in 1920, a number of Danes remained as a minority within German territories.
After the occupation of Denmark by Germany in World War II, the 1948 orthography reform dropped the German-influenced rule of capitalizing nouns, and introduced the letter . Three 20th-century Danish authors have become Nobel Prize laureates in Literature: Karl Gjellerup and Henrik Pontoppidan (joint recipients in 1917) and Johannes V. Jensen (awarded 1944).

In the 20th century, they have all but disappeared, and the standard language has extended throughout the country. Minor regional pronunciation variation of the standard language, sometimes called  ("regional languages") remain, and are in some cases vital. Today, the major varieties of Standard Danish are High Copenhagen Standard, associated with elderly, well to-do, and well educated people of the capital, and low Copenhagen speech traditionally associated with the working class, but today adopted as the prestige variety of the younger generations. Also, in the 21st century, the influence of immigration has had linguistic consequences, such as the emergence of a so-called multiethnolect in the urban areas, an immigrant Danish variety (also known as ), combining elements of different immigrant languages such as Arabic, Turkish, and Kurdish, as well as English and Danish.

Geographic distribution and status

Danish Realm 
Within the Danish Realm, Danish is the national language of Denmark and one of two official languages of the Faroe Islands (alongside Faroese). A Faroese variant of Danish is known as Gøtudanskt. Until 2009, Danish had also been one of two official languages of Greenland (alongside Greenlandic). Danish is widely spoken in Greenland now as lingua franca, and an unknown portion of the native Greenlandic population has Danish as their first language; a large percentage of the native Greenlandic population speaks Danish as a second language since its introduction into the education system as a compulsory language in 1928. Danish was an official language in Iceland until 1944, but is today still widely used and is a mandatory subject in school taught as a second foreign language after English. Iceland was a territory ruled by Denmark–Norway, one of whose official languages was Danish. About 10% of the population of Greenland speak Danish as their first language owing to immigration.

No law stipulates an official language for Denmark, making Danish the de facto official language only. The Code of Civil Procedure does, however, lay down Danish as the language of the courts. Since 1997, public authorities have been obliged to observe the official spelling by way of the Orthography Law. In the 21st century, discussions have been held regarding creating a language law that would make Danish the official language of Denmark.

Surrounding countries

In addition, a noticeable community of Danish speakers is in Southern Schleswig, the portion of Germany bordering Denmark, and a variant of Standard Danish, Southern Schleswig Danish, is spoken in the area. Since 2015, Schleswig-Holstein has officially recognized Danish as a regional language, just as German is north of the border. Furthermore, Danish is one of the official languages of the European Union and one of the working languages of the Nordic Council. Under the Nordic Language Convention, Danish-speaking citizens of the Nordic countries have the opportunity to use their native language when interacting with official bodies in other Nordic countries without being liable for any interpretation or translation costs.

The more widespread of the two varieties of written Norwegian, is very close to Danish, because standard Danish was used as the de facto administrative language until 1814 and one of the official languages of Denmark–Norway.  is based on Danish, unlike the other variety of Norwegian, which is based on the Norwegian dialects, with Old Norwegian as an important reference point. Also North Frisian and Gutnish (Gutamål) were influenced by Danish.

Other locations
There are also Danish emigrant communities in other places of the world who still use the language in some form. In the Americas, Danish-speaking communities can be found in the US, Canada, Argentina and Brazil.

Dialects 

Standard Danish is the language based on dialects spoken in and around the capital, Copenhagen. Unlike Swedish and Norwegian, Danish does not have more than one regional speech norm. More than 25% of all Danish speakers live in the metropolitan area of the capital, and most government agencies, institutions, and major businesses keep their main offices in Copenhagen, which has resulted in a very homogeneous national speech norm.

Danish dialects can be divided into the traditional dialects, which differ from modern Standard Danish in both phonology and grammar, and the Danish accents or regional languages, which are local varieties of the Standard language distinguished mostly by pronunciation and local vocabulary colored by traditional dialects. Traditional dialects are now mostly extinct in Denmark, with only the oldest generations still speaking them.

Danish traditional dialects are divided into three main dialect areas:
 Insular Danish, including dialects of the Danish islands of Zealand, Funen, Lolland, Falster, and Møn
 Jutlandic, further divided in North, East, West, and South Jutlandic
 East Danish, including dialects of Bornholm, Scania, Halland and Blekinge 

Jutlandic is further divided into Southern Jutlandic and Northern Jutlandic, with Northern Jutlandic subdivided into North Jutlandic and West Jutlandic. Insular Danish is divided into Zealand, Funen, Møn, and Lolland-Falster dialect areas―each with addition internal variation. Bornholmian is the only Eastern Danish dialect spoken in Denmark. Since the Swedish conquest of the Eastern Danish provinces Skåne, Halland and Blekinge in 1645/1658, the Eastern Danish dialects there have come under heavy Swedish influence. Many residents now speak regional variants of Standard Swedish. However, many researchers still consider the dialects in Scania, Halland and Blekinge as part of the East Danish dialect group. The Swedish National Encyclopedia from 1995 classifies Scanian as an Eastern Danish dialect with South Swedish elements.

Traditional dialects differ in phonology, grammar, and vocabulary from standard Danish. Four main regional variants for the realization of stød are known: In Southeastern Jutlandic, Southernmost Funen, Southern Langeland, and Ærø, no  is used, but instead a pitch accent (like in Norwegian, Swedish and Gutnish). South of a line ('the stød border') going through central South Jutland, crossing Southern Funen and central Langeland and north of Lolland-Falster, Møn, Southern Zealand and Bornholm neither  nor pitch accent exists. Most of Jutland and on Zealand use , and in Zealandic traditional dialects and regional language,  occurs more often than in the standard language. In Zealand, the  line divides Southern Zealand (without ), an area which used to be directly under the Crown, from the rest of the Island that used to be the property of various noble estates.

Grammatically, a dialectally significant feature is the number of grammatical genders. Standard Danish has two genders and the definite form of nouns is formed by the use of suffixes, while Western Jutlandic has only one gender and the definite form of nouns uses an article before the noun itself, in the same fashion as West Germanic languages. The Bornholmian dialect has maintained to this day many archaic features, such as a distinction between three grammatical genders. Insular Danish traditional dialects also conserved three grammatical genders. By 1900, Zealand insular dialects had been reduced to two genders under influence from the standard language, but other Insular varieties, such as Funen dialect had not. Besides using three genders, the old Insular or Funen dialect, could also use personal pronouns (like he and she) in certain cases, particularly referring to animals.

Phonology 

The sound system of Danish is unusual, particularly in its large vowel inventory and in the unusual prosody. In informal or rapid speech, the language is prone to considerable reduction of unstressed syllables, creating many vowel-less syllables with syllabic consonants, as well as reduction of final consonants. Furthermore, the language's prosody does not include many clues about the sentence structure, unlike many other languages, making it relatively more difficult to perceive the different sounds of the speech flow. These factors taken together make Danish pronunciation difficult to master for learners, and Danish children are indicated to take slightly longer in learning to segment speech in early childhood.

Vowels 
Although somewhat depending on analysis, most modern variants of Danish distinguish 12 long vowels, 13 short vowels, and two schwa vowels,  and  that only occur in unstressed syllables. This gives a total of 27 different vowel phonemes – a very large number among the world's languages. Questions of analysis may give a slightly different inventory, for example based on whether r-colored vowels are considered distinct phonemes.  gives 25 "full vowels", not counting the two unstressed schwa vowels.

Consonants 
The consonant inventory is comparatively simple.  distinguishes 16 non-syllabic consonant phonemes in Danish.

Many of these phonemes have quite different allophones in onset and coda where intervocalic consonants followed by a full vowel are treated as in onset, otherwise as in coda. The pronunciation of t, is in between a simple aspirated  and a fully affricated  (as has happened in German with the second High German consonant shift from t to z). There is dialectal variation, and some Jutlandic dialects may be less affricated than other varieties, with Northern and Western Jutlandic traditional dialects having an almost unaspirated dry t.

 often have slight frication, but are usually pronounced as approximants.

The sound  is found for example in the word /sjovˀ/ "fun" pronounced  and  "marijuana" pronounced . This makes it unnecessary to postulate a -phoneme in Danish.

In onset  is realized as a uvu-pharyngeal approximant, but in coda it is either realized as a non-syllabic low central vowel,  or simply coalesces with the preceding vowel. The phenomenon is comparable to the r in German or in non-rhotic pronunciations of English. Only very few, middle-aged or elderly, speakers of Jutlandic retain a frontal  which is then usually realised as a flapped  or approximant .

Prosody 
Danish is characterized by a prosodic feature called  (lit. "thrust"). This is a form of laryngealization or creaky voice. Some sources have described it as a glottal stop, but this is a very infrequent realization, and today phoneticians consider it a phonation type or a prosodic phenomenon. The distribution of stød in the vocabulary is related to the distribution of the common Scandinavian pitch accents found in most dialects of Norwegian and Swedish.

Stress is phonemic and distinguishes words such as   "cheapest" and   "car driver".

Danish intonation has been described by Nina Grønnum as a hierarchical model where components such as the stress group, sentence type and prosodic phrase are combined, and where the stress group is the main intonation unit and in Copenhagen Standard Danish mainly has a certain pitch pattern that reaches its lowest peak on the stressed syllable followed by its highest peak on the following unstressed syllable, after which it declines gradually until the next stress group.
The  is also dependent on stress, while some varieties also realize it primarily as a tone.
There are also various studies on specific interactional phenomena in Danish focusing on pitch, such as Mikkelsen & Kragelund on ways to mark the end of a story and Steensig (2001) on turn-taking.

Grammar 

Similarly to the case of English, modern Danish grammar is the result of a gradual change from a typical Indo-European dependent-marking pattern with a rich inflectional morphology and relatively free word order, to a mostly analytic pattern with little inflection, a fairly fixed SVO word order and a complex syntax. Vestiges of the Germanic case and gender system are found in the pronoun system. Typical for an Indo-European language, Danish follows accusative morphosyntactic alignment. Danish distinguishes at least seven major word classes: verbs, nouns, numerals, adjectives, adverbs, articles, prepositions, conjunctions, interjections and onomatopoeia.

Nouns 
Nouns are inflected for number (singular vs. plural) and definiteness, and are classified into two grammatical genders. Only pronouns inflect for case, and the previous genitive case has become an enclitic. A distinctive feature of the Nordic languages, including Danish, is that the definite articles, which also mark noun gender, have developed into suffixes. Typical of Germanic languages plurals are either irregular or "strong" stems inflected through umlaut (i.e. changing the vowel of the stem) (e.g.  "foot/feet",  "man/men") or "weak" stems inflected through affixation (e.g.  "ship/ships",  "woman/women").

Gender 

Standard Danish has two nominal genders: common and neuter; the common gender arose as the historical feminine and masculine genders conflated into a single category. Some traditional dialects retain a three-way gender distinction, between masculine, feminine and neuter, and some dialects of Jutland have a masculine/feminine contrast. While the majority of Danish nouns (ca. 75%) have the common gender, and neuter is often used for inanimate objects, the genders of nouns are not generally predictable and must in most cases be memorized. The gender of a noun determines the form of adjectives that modify it, and the form of the definite suffixes.

Definiteness 

Definiteness is marked by two mutually exclusive articles: either a postposed enclitic or a preposed article which is the obligatory way to mark definiteness when nouns are modified by an adjective. Neuter nouns take the clitic , and common gender nouns take . Hence, the common gender noun  "a man" (indefinite) has the definite form  "the man", whereas the neuter noun  "a house" (indefinite) has the definite form, "the house" (definite) . 

Indefinite:
Jeg så et hus: "I saw a house"

Definite with enclitic article:
Jeg så huset: "I saw the house"

Definite with preposed demonstrative article:
Jeg så det store hus: "I saw the big house"

"boys >  "the boys" and  "girls" >  "the girls"), and nouns ending in  lose the last  before adding the -ne suffix (e.g. "Danes" >  "the Danes").

Number 

Most irregular nouns have an ablaut plural (i.e. with a change in the stem vowel), or combine ablaut stem-change with the suffix, and some have unique plural forms. Unique forms may be inherited (e.g. the plural of  "eye", which is the old dual form ), or for loan words they may be borrowed from the donor language (e.g. the word  "account" which is borrowed from Italian and uses the Italian masculine plural form  "accounts").

Possession 
Possessive phrases are formed with the enclitic -s, for example  "my father's house" where the noun  carries the possessive enclitic. This is however not an example of genitive case marking, because in the case of longer noun phrases the -s attaches to the last word in the phrase, which need not be the head-noun or even a noun at all. For example, the phrases  "the king of Denmark's candy factory", where the factory is owned by the king of Denmark, or  "that is the daughter of the girl that Uffe lives with", where the enclitic attaches to a stranded preposition.

Pronouns 

As does English, the Danish pronominal system retains a distinction between nominative and oblique case. The nominative form of pronouns is used when pronouns occur as grammatical subject of a sentence (and only when non-coordinated and without a following modifier), and oblique forms are used for all non-subject functions including direct and indirect object, predicative, comparative and other types of constructions. The third person singular pronouns also distinguish between animate masculine ( "he"), animate feminine ( "she") forms, as well as inanimate neuter ( "it") and inanimate common gender ( "it"). 

: "I sleep"
: "you sleep"
: "I kiss you"
: "you kiss me"

Possessive pronouns have independent and adjectival uses, but the same form. The form is used both adjectivally preceding a possessed noun ( "it is my horse"), and independently in place of the possessed noun ( "it is mine"). In the third person singular,  is used when the possessor is also the subject of the sentence, whereas  ("his"),  (her) and  "its" is used when the possessor is different from the grammatical subject.

Han tog sin hat: He took his (own) hat
 Han tog hans hat: He took his hat (someone else's hat)

Nominal compounds 
Like all Germanic languages, Danish forms compound nouns. There are also irregular linking elements.

Verbs 

Danish verbs are morphologically simple, marking very few grammatical categories. They do not mark person or number of subject, although the marking of plural subjects was still used in writing as late as the 19th century. Verbs have a past, non-past and infinitive form, past and present participle forms, and a passive, and an imperative.

Tense, aspect, mood, and voice 
Verbs can be divided into two main classes, the strong/irregular verbs and the regular/weak verbs. The regular verbs are also divided into two classes, those that take the past suffix  and those that take the suffix .

The infinitive always ends in a vowel, usually -e (pronounced ), infinitive forms are preceded by the article  (pronounced ) in some syntactic functions. The non-past or present tense takes the suffix , except for a few strong verbs that have irregular non-past forms. The past form does not necessarily mark past tense, but also counterfactuality or conditionality, and the non-past has many uses besides present tense time reference.

"run"),  (e.g. købt "bought"). But some transitive verbs form the perfect using  ("to be") instead, and some may use both with a difference in meaning.

 . : She has walked. The plane has flown
 . : She has left. The plane has taken off
 . : She had walked. The plane had flown
 . : She had left. The plane had taken off

The passive form takes the suffix -s:  ("the newspaper is read every day"). Another passive construction uses the auxiliary verb  "to become": .

The imperative form is the infinitive without the final schwa-vowel, with  potentially being applied depending on syllable structure.:
: "run!"

Numerals 
The numerals are formed on the basis of a vigesimal system with various rules. In the word forms of numbers above 20, the units are stated before the tens, so 21 is rendered , literally "one and twenty".

The numeral  means  (literally "half second", implying "one plus half of the second one"). Similarly, the temporal designation halv tre, literally "half three (o'clock)", is half past two.

One peculiar feature of the Danish language is that the numerals 50, 60, 70, 80 and 90 are (as are the French numerals from 80 through 99) based on a vigesimal system, meaning that the score (20) is used as a base unit in counting. The ending  meaning "times twenty" is no longer included in cardinal numbers, but may still be used in ordinal numbers.

Syntax 
Danish basic constituent order in simple sentences with both a subject and an object is Subject–Verb–Object. However, Danish is also a V2 language, which means that the verb must always be the second constituent of the sentence. Following the Danish grammarian Paul Diderichsen Danish grammar tends to be analyzed as consisting of slots or fields, and in which certain types of sentence material can be moved to the pre-verbal (or foundation) field to achieve different pragmatic effects. Usually the sentence material occupying the preverbal slot has to be pragmatically marked, usually either new information or topics. There is no rule that subjects must occur in the preverbal slot, but since subject and topic often coincide, they often do. Therefore, whenever any sentence material that is not the subject occurs in the preverbal position the subject is demoted to postverbal position and the sentence order becomes VSO.

: "Peter saw Jytte"

but

: "Yesterday, Peter saw Jytte"

When there is no pragmatically marked constituents in the sentence to take the preverbal slot (for example when all the information is new), the slot has to take a dummy subject "der".

: there came a girl in through the door, "A girl came in the door"

Main clauses 
 describes the basic order of sentence constituents in main clauses as comprising the following 8 positions:

Position 0 is not part of the sentence and can only contain sentential connectors (such as conjunctions or interjections). Position 1 can contain any sentence constituent. Position 2 can only contain the finite verb. Position 3 is the subject position, unless the subject is fronted to occur in position 1. Position 4 can only contain light adverbs and the negation. Position 5 is for non-finite verbs, such as auxiliaries. Position 6 is the position of direct and indirect objects, and position 7 is for heavy adverbial constituents.

Questions with wh-words are formed differently from yes/no questions. In wh-questions the question word occupies the preverbal field, regardless of whether its grammatical role is subject or object or adverbial. In yes/no questions the preverbal field is empty, so that the sentence begins with the verb.

Wh-question:
: whom saw she, "whom did she see?"
: saw she him?, "did she see him?"

Subordinate clauses 
In subordinate clauses, the word order differs from that of main clauses. In the subordinate clause structure the verb is preceded by the subject and any light adverbial material (e.g. negation). Complement clauses begin with the particle  in the "connector field".

Han sagde, at han ikke ville gå: he said that he not would go, "He said that he did not want to go"

Jeg kender en mand, som bor i Helsingør: "I know a man who lives in Elsinore"

 Writing system and alphabet 

The oldest preserved examples of written Danish (from the Iron and Viking Ages) are in the Runic alphabet. The introduction of Christianity also brought the Latin script to Denmark, and at the end of the High Middle Ages Runes had more or less been replaced by Latin letters.

Danish orthography is conservative, using most of the conventions established in the 16th century. The spoken language however has changed a lot since then, creating a gap between the spoken and written languages. Since 1955, Dansk Sprognævn has been the official language council in Denmark.

A spelling reform in 1948 introduced the letter , already in use in Norwegian and Swedish, into the Danish alphabet to replace the digraph . When representing the same sound ,  is treated like  in alphabetical sorting, though it appears to be two letters.

Research
Danish is a well-studied language, and multiple universities in Denmark have departments devoted to Danish or linguistics with active research projects on the language, such as the Linguistic Circle of Copenhagen, and there are many dictionaries and technological resources on the language. The language council Dansk Sprognævn also publishes research on the language both nationally and internationally. There are also research centers focusing specifically on the dialects: The Peter Skautrup center at Aarhus University describes the dialects and varieties of the Jutlandic peninsula and is working on a dictionary of Jutlandic, while the Center for Dialect Research at University of Copenhagen works on the Insular Danish varieties. The Puzzle of Danish - a research project at Aarhus University, funded by the Danish Research Council  - investigates whether the challenging sound structure of Danish has an impact on how native speakers process and produce Danish language. Their findings suggest that native speaker of Danish tend to use contextual cues to process Danish sounds and sentences, more than native speakers of other comparable languages, and that they produce more lexically, syntactically, and semantically redundant language in conversation.

Multiple corpora of Danish language data are available. The Danish Gigaword project provides a curated corpus of a billion words.  is a corpus of written texts in Danish.

Academic descriptions of the language are published both in Danish and English. Multiple phonologies have been written, most importantly by Basbøll and Grønnum, based on work that used to take place at the former Institute of Phonetics at the University of Copenhagen.

 Example text 
Article 1 of the Universal Declaration of Human Rights in Danish:

Article 1 of the Universal Declaration of Human Rights in English:All human beings are born free and equal in dignity and rights. They are endowed with reason and conscience and should act towards one another in a spirit of brotherhood.''

See also 
Realm languages:
 Faroese
 Greenlandic

Nordic languages:
 Icelandic
 Norwegian
 Swedish

References

Bibliography

External links 

 "Sproget.dk" (a website where you can find guidance, information and answers to questions about the Danish language and language matters in Denmark (in Danish))
 "Samtalegrammatik.dk" (parts of a grammar of spoken Danish)

 
Fusional languages
Languages of Denmark
Languages of Norway
Languages of Sweden
Languages of Iceland
Languages of the Faroe Islands
Languages of Germany
Languages of Greenland
East Scandinavian languages
North Germanic languages
Scandinavian culture
Subject–verb–object languages
Verb-second languages
Stress-timed languages